"All In" is the eleventh episode of the seventh season of the American television drama series Homeland, and the 83rd episode overall. It premiered on Showtime on April 22, 2018.

Plot 
Senator Paley (Dylan Baker) visits Dar Adal (F. Murray Abraham) in prison, asking for help in discerning what Saul is doing in Russia. Dar looks at the flight manifest and quickly recognizes that Saul and Carrie are organizing a covert operation. Dar then gives him advice on how to track down Saul's task force stateside, which leads them to Clint (Peter Vack). Janet (Ellen Adair), the  Chief of Staff to Senator Paley, threatens Clint with legal action. Clint confesses that Saul and Carrie are in Russia to exfiltrate Simone (Sandrine Holt), who is indeed alive. Janet urges Paley to relay this information to the Russian ambassador (Elya Baskin) to sabotage the mission, thereby ending Keane's hopes to salvage her administration. Paley, visibly conflicted, does nothing while Janet is seen talking to the ambassador herself.

Saul (Mandy Patinkin) and Carrie (Claire Danes) sit down for a diplomatic meeting with representatives from the SVR (state intelligence agency) and the GRU (military intelligence agency). Saul insists on the presence of Yevgeny Gromov (Costa Ronin) before proceeding — a pretense to lure Gromov away from Simone. When Gromov shows up at the meeting, a team led by Anson (James D'Arcy) storms the safehouse where Simone is being kept, but are forced to retreat after being ambushed by guards.

Saul declares the mission a failure, but Carrie is determined to devise a new plan before leaving. She observes dissension between the SVR's General Yakushin and the GRU's Colonel Mirov during the meeting, and wonders how her team can exploit the tense relationship. Sandy (Catherine Curtin) discovers that General Yakushin (Misha Kuznetsov) of the SVR is hiding $300M in various U.S. banking institutions.

President Keane (Elizabeth Marvel) gets the news that the Supreme Court has rejected the dismissal of four of her Cabinet secretaries. With that, the Cabinet has the sufficient votes to invoke the 25th Amendment. Vice President Warner (Beau Bridges) arrives at the Oval Office to personally relieve a stunned Keane of her command.

General Yakushin meets with Saul, livid that his bank accounts have been emptied of funds. Saul tells Yakushin that he will return the money in exchange for Simone Martin. When approached by Yakushin, Mirov (Merab Ninidze) falsely denies any knowledge of Simone or her whereabouts. Yakushin responds by sending 30 heavily armed, masked men to GRU headquarters where Simone is being held in an upstairs suite. Chaos and violence ensues as the SVR starts forcefully clearing out the building en masse; Carrie and Anson gain entry clothed like the masked men from the SVR.

Carrie accesses the balcony of Simone's suite via a ledge from a nearby window. Simone holds Carrie at gunpoint but Carrie convinces Simone to come with her, making her understand she is now a massive liability to the Russians who will consider her expendable. Yevgeny sees "Simone" taken away by Anson and orders the car to be followed, but is actually duped by Carrie wearing Simone's scarf and a black wig. The real Simone, wearing a blonde wig, safely escapes in another car with Bennet (Ari Fliakos).

Production 
The episode was directed by Alex Graves and co-written by executive producers Patrick Harbinson and Chip Johannessen. Scenes taking place in Moscow were filmed in Budapest, Hungary.

Reception

Reviews 
The episode received an approval rating of 100% on the review aggregator Rotten Tomatoes based on 9 reviews.

The A.V. Clubs Scott Von Doviak rated the episode "A−", citing the "heart-pounding action".  Shirley Li of Entertainment Weekly gave the episode a "B+" grade, calling it "thrilling" and "an hour of Homeland that felt capital-B BIG".

Ratings 
The original broadcast was watched by 1.39 million viewers.

References

External links 

 "All In" at Showtime
 

2018 American television episodes
Homeland (season 7) episodes